The 2015 Philippine Basketball Association (PBA) Commissioner's Cup, also known as the 2015 PLDT Home TelPad-PBA Commissioner's Cup for sponsorship reasons, was the second conference of the 2014–15 PBA season. The tournament began on January 27, 2015 and ended on April 29, 2015. The tournament allows teams to hire foreign players or imports with a height limit of 6'9" for the top eight teams of the Philippine Cup, while the bottom four teams will be allowed to hire imports with no height limit.

Format
The following format was observed for the duration of the conference:
 Single-round robin eliminations; 11 games per team; Teams are then seeded by basis on win–loss records.
Top eight teams will advance to the quarterfinals. Ties are broken among head-to-head records of the tied teams.
Quarterfinals:
QF1: #1 seed vs #8 seed (#1 seed twice-to-beat)
QF2: #2 seed vs #7 seed (#2 seed twice-to-beat)
QF3: #3 seed vs #6 seed (best-of-3 series)
QF4: #4 seed vs #5 seed (best-of-3 series)
Semifinals (best-of-5 series):
SF1: QF1 vs. QF4 winners
SF2: QF2 vs. QF3 winners
Finals (best-of-7 series)
Winners of the semifinals

Elimination round

Team standings

Schedule

Results

Bracket

Quarterfinals

(1) Rain or Shine vs. (8) Barangay Ginebra

(2) Talk 'N Text vs. (7) Barako Bull

(3) Purefoods Star vs. (6) Alaska

(4) NLEX vs. (5) Meralco

Semifinals

(1) Rain or Shine vs. (5) Meralco

(2) Talk 'N Text vs. (3) Purefoods Star

Finals

Awards

Conference
Best Player of the Conference: Jayson Castro (Talk 'N Text Tropang Texters)
Bobby Parks Best Import of the Conference: Wayne Chism (Rain or Shine Elasto Painters)
Finals MVP: Ranidel de Ocampo (Talk 'N Text Tropang Texters)

Players of the Week

Imports 
The following is the list of imports, which had played for their respective teams at least once, with the returning imports in italics. Highlighted are the imports who stayed with their respective teams for the whole conference.

Import handicapping

References

External links
 PBA.ph

PBA Commissioner's Cup
Commissioner's Cup